In probability theory, a pregaussian class or pregaussian set of functions is a set of functions, square integrable with respect to some probability measure, such that there exists a certain Gaussian process, indexed by this set, satisfying the conditions below.

Definition
For a probability space (S, Σ, P), denote by  a set of square integrable with respect to P functions , that is

Consider a set .

Such a process exists because the given covariance is positive definite. This covariance defines a semi-inner product as well as a pseudometric on  given by

Brownian bridge
The  process is a generalization of the brownian bridge. Consider  with P being the uniform measure. This set of the indicator functions is pregaussian, moreover, it is the Donsker class.

References 

Stochastic processes
Empirical process
Normal distribution